Joe T. Robinson High School is a public high school for students in grades 9 through 12 located in unincorporated Pulaski County, Arkansas, United States, just outside the city limits of Little Rock.

The school is named after then U.S. Senator Joseph Taylor Robinson in 1927 during the same year Pulaski County Special School District (PCSSD) was formed. Robinson High School moved to its current facilities at the start of the 1981–82 school year and for 2010–11 hosts about 500 pupils, the smallest PCSSD high school population. The school is often referred to as “Pulaski Robinson.”

Its service area includes portions of Little Rock, Natural Steps, Roland, and the Pulaski County portion of Alexander.

Jason Pickering is the school's principal.

Academics  
The school is accredited by AdvancED since 1965 and by the ADE (ADE). The assumed course of study is the ADE Smart Core curriculum, which requires 22 units before students graduate. Students complete regular (core and career focus) courses and exams and may select Advanced Placement (AP) coursework and exams that provide an opportunity for college credit before high school graduation.

Extracurricular activities 
The Robinson High School mascot is the Senator with black and gold as the school colors. The Robinson Senators compete in a variety of sports including football, basketball, track and field in the 4A-7 Conference (2012–14) administered by the Arkansas Activities Association.

 Football: The Senators football won  state football championships in 1980, 2019, and 2021.
 Track and field: The boys track team won four consecutive state track and field championships between 1971 and 1974.

Notable people 

 Nate Garner—American football player in the National Football League
 Michael Tinsley (2003)—Athlete, 2012 London Olympics Silver Medalist, Men's 400 m Hurdles

References

External links 

 

1927 establishments in Arkansas
Educational institutions established in 1927
High schools in Pulaski County, Arkansas
Public high schools in Arkansas
Pulaski County Special School District